The 2020–21 Kansas Jayhawks men's basketball team represented the University of Kansas in the 2020–21 NCAA Division I men's basketball season, which was the Jayhawks' 123rd basketball season. The Jayhawks, members of the Big 12 Conference, played their home games at Allen Fieldhouse in Lawrence, Kansas. They were led by 18th year Hall of Fame head coach Bill Self. The Jayhawks finished the regular season 20–8 overall and 2nd in the Big 12. They were selected to the 2021 NCAA tournament as a 3 seed. They would be eliminated in the second round.

Season notes
On November 30, 2020, the Jayhawks were ranked in the AP poll for the 223rd consecutive week, breaking UCLA's record of 222 from 1966 to 1980. They had been ranked in every weekly AP poll since February 3, 2009. The Jayhawks went on an eight-game winning streak after losing their season opener. Following road losses to Oklahoma State, Baylor, and Oklahoma, the Jayhawks lost 3 straight games for the first time since the 2012–13 season and only the third time under Self. The streak is only the 9th losing streak of any length under Self. In total they lost five of seven games, which lead to them unranked being in the AP poll released on February 8, 2021, ending their ranked streak at 231. After going 3–0 in games that week, they would re-enter the rankings at 23 on February 15, 2021. The Jayhawks were swept by Texas, which was only the 2nd time under Self they were swept in the regular season. They finished 12–6 in Big 12 play, which gave them a 2nd-place finish in the conference. It is the 21st consecutive season the Jayhawks finished in the top three of the Big 12. Additionally, each year of the Big 12's 25 years of existence, Kansas has finished in the top five of the conference. They were selected to the NCAA tournament, their NCAA record extending 31st consecutive tournament, as a 3 seed. The Jayhawks would lose in the second round to USC 51–85, their worst defeat in the NCAA Tournament and their 3rd worst defeat overall in program history. The loss was also the Jayhawks lowest points scored in the NCAA Tournament since the shot clock was introduced in the 1985–86 season. The Jayhawks also ended their streak of 15 consecutive seasons with 25 or more wins, additionally, their 21 wins was the teams lowest win total since the 1988-89 season. However, both win totals were due in part to the Jayhawks playing fewer non-conference games than normal due to the COVID-19 pandemic.

Roster changes

Graduation
Below are players from the previous season who ran out of college eligibility.

Early draft entrants

2020 recruiting class

|-
| colspan="7" style="padding-left:10px;" | Overall recruiting rankings:     247 Sports: 16     Rivals: 12       ESPN: 20 
|}

Transfers

Incoming

Outgoing

COVID-19 Opt-outs

Roster

Schedule and results

COVID-19 impact

Due to COVID-19, KU's annual Late Night in the Phog, the Jayhawks name for their Midnight Madness event, was done virtually. On October 13, Kansas and Missouri announced their scheduled renewal of their rivalry would be postponed a year and will begin play in 2021. On October 26, the University of Kansas announced that about 1,500 fans would be allowed, about 10% capacity. Despite the announcement saying that 1,500 fans would be allowed, the school has consistently reported attendance numbers of 2,500 for home games.

In total, nine games and the Wooden Classic, which the Jayhawks were scheduled to play in, were cancelled, and one game was postponed.

The Jayhawks finished the regular season without any known positive COVID-19 tests from players, coaches, or support staff. They would, however, have an unnamed player test positive prior to the semifinals of the Big 12 tournament. When Bill Self announced the positive test, he also confirmed that two other players had tested positive making a total of three positive tests. While it was not confirmed that they had tested positive, earlier that week Tristin Enaruna and David McCormack and been put in the COVID protocol after being exposed to it.

Schedule
All games listed below had limited or no attendance due to the pandemic.

|-
!colspan=12 style=| Regular Season

|-
!colspan=12 style=| Big 12 Tournament

|-
!colspan=12 style=| NCAA tournament

Rankings

References

Kansas Jayhawks men's basketball seasons
Kansas
2020 in sports in Kansas
Kansas